Elizabeth Mannshardt (also published as Elizabeth C. Mannshardt-Shamseldin and Elizabeth Mannshardt-Hawk) is an American environmental statistician, professor, and government executive. She is the Associate Director of the Information Access and Analytic Services Division at the United States Environmental Protection Agency and an adjunct associate professor in the department of statistics at North Carolina State University. Her research focuses on climate change and extremes in climate and weather.

Education and career
Mannshardt is from Yuba City, California, and was the 1995 valedictorian of Yuba City High School. She majored in mathematics at Sonoma State University, and did graduate study in statistics at the University of North Carolina at Chapel Hill, earning a master's degree in 2005 and completing her PhD in 2008. Her dissertation, Asymptotic Multivariate Kriging Using Estimated Parameters with Bayesian Prediction Methods for Non-Linear Predictands, was supervised by Richard L. Smith.

While a doctoral student, Mannshardt was also a research fellow at the National Oceanic and Atmospheric Administration. She became a postdoctoral researcher at the Statistical and Applied Mathematical Sciences Institute, working with Peter F. Craigmile, and a visiting assistant professor at Duke University before becoming a government statistician at the EPA. 

Mannshardt chaired the Government Statistics Section of the American Statistical Association (ASA) in 2019. She is the 2022 chair of the ASA Section on Statistics and the Environment.

Recognition
Mannshardt was named as a Fellow of the American Statistical Association in 2022.

Personal life
Mannshardt is married to software architect James Hawk. She is also a beach volleyball player, frequently playing in mixed doubles with her husband.

References

Year of birth missing (living people)
Living people
People from Yuba City, California
American statisticians
American women statisticians
University of North Carolina at Chapel Hill alumni
People of the United States Environmental Protection Agency
Fellows of the American Statistical Association